Gull Lake may refer to:

Native American entities
Gull Lake Indian Reservation, located near Brainerd, Minnesota, surrounding Gull Lake
Gull Lake Band of Mississippi Chippewa, whose descendants are located on the White Earth Indian Reservation

Lakes

Canada
 Gull Lake (Ontario)
 Gull Lake (Alberta)
 Gull Lake (Nova Scotia)
 Goéland Lake, Québec (English: Gull Lake)

United States
 Gull Lake (Michigan)
 Gull Lake (Cass County, Minnesota)
 Gull Lake (McKeever, Herkimer County, New York)

South Georgia and the South Sandwich Islands (British Overseas Territory)
 Gull Lake, South Georgia

Places
 Gull Lake, Alberta, a summer village in Alberta, Canada
 Gull Lake, Manitoba, a hamlet in Rural Municipality of Alexander, Manitoba, Canada
 Gull Lake, Saskatchewan, a town in Saskatchewan, Canada
 Rural Municipality of Gull Lake No. 139, the rural municipality that surrounds the town

Administrative features
 Gull Lake (electoral district), a former electoral district in Saskatchewan, Canada